The scale-rayed wrasse, Acantholabrus palloni, is a species of  wrasse native to the eastern Atlantic Ocean where it occurs from Norway to Gabon (including the various eastern Atlantic island groups) and in the Mediterranean Sea and the Adriatic Sea. It is a commercially important food fish. It is currently the only known member of its genus.

It was first described by naturalist Antoine Risso, in 1810.

References

Labridae
Monotypic fish genera
Fish described in 1810